Chopan is a town and a nagar panchayat in Sonbhadra district  in the state of Uttar Pradesh, India.
It is situated on the Sone River. Chopan Railway station is a junction in Sonbhadra district.

Geography 
It has an average elevation of 159 metres (521 feet).

Demographics
 India census, Chopan had total population of 14,302. The male population was 7,710, and the female population was 6,592. Chopan has an average literacy rate of 85.1%, higher than the national literacy rate with male literacy of 90% and female literacy of 79%. 14% of the population is under 6 years of age.

References

Cities and towns in Sonbhadra district